Mérédis Houmounou (born 28 November 1988 in Nancy, France) is a French basketball player who played for French Pro A league club Cholet between 2009 and 2011.

In August 2018, he signed with SLUC Nancy Basket.

References

French men's basketball players
Sportspeople from Nancy, France
1988 births
Living people
Cholet Basket players
SLUC Nancy Basket players